Clarissa Rizal (June 4, 1956 – December 7, 2016) was a Tlingit artist of Filipino descent. She was best known as a Chilkat and Ravenstail weaver, but she also worked in painting, printmaking, carving, and sculpting.

Personal life 
Rizal was born on June 4, 1956, in Juneau, Alaska, with the last name of Lampe. Through her mother, she is of the T'ak Dein Taan (black-legged kittywake) clan of Hoonah/Glacier Bay. She also produced works for a time using the married name of Hudson. Rizal raised a son and two daughters; both daughters are weavers.  The daughters, Lily Hope and Ursala Hudson, weave and teach in Alaska and other states. Rizal died on December 7, 2016, in Pagosa Springs, Colorado.

Apprenticeship and writing 
When in her twenties, Rizal apprenticed under Jennie Thlunaut to learn Chilkat weaving. Thlunaut was in her 90s. In 2005, Rizal published a book titled Jennie Weaves an Apprentice: A Chilkat Weaver's Handbook. It won a 2007–08 Honoring Alaska's Indigenous Literature Award from the Alaska Native Knowledge Network at University of Alaska, Fairbanks.

Rizal contributed illustrations to the children's book Mary's Wild Winter Feast (2014).

Awards and honors 
Rizal also received awards for her artwork. She won a 2013 Artist Fellowship from the Rasmuson Foundation. In 2015, Rizal received a Native Arts & Cultures Foundation National Artist Fellowship. She was a 2011 and 2016 First Peoples Fund Cultural Capital Fellow. Rizal was a recipient of a 2016 National Heritage Fellowship awarded by the National Endowment for the Arts, which is the United States government's highest honor in the folk and traditional arts. Her mentor Jennie Thlunaut received the same award in 1986.

One of the last robes on which Rizal worked was a collaborative effort, Weavers Across the Water. At least fifty weavers either submitted squares or helped Rizal in other ways. The squares were woven together into a single robe. It was first worn by master carver Wayne Price at the dedication of a new Huna tribal house in Glacier Bay. Rizal then took the robe to Washington, DC, for the NEA award event.

References

Further reading

External links
 

1956 births
2016 deaths
20th-century American artists
21st-century American artists
20th-century Native Americans
21st-century Native Americans
American weavers
Artists from Alaska
Native American textile artists
Tlingit people
Women textile artists
National Heritage Fellowship winners
20th-century Native American women
21st-century Native American women
 Textile artists